Thomas Grunenberg (born 2 November 1955 in West Berlin) is a German football manager and former player.

References

External links 
 

1955 births
Living people
Footballers from Berlin
German footballers
Association football forwards
2. Bundesliga players
Tennis Borussia Berlin players
German football managers
20th-century German people